Adolf Holtzmann (2 May 1810 in Karlsruhe – 3 July 1870 in Heidelberg) was a German professor and philologist. His name is associated with a Proto-Germanic sound law known as Holtzmann's Law.

He studied theology at the universities of Halle and Berlin, where he was a student of Friedrich Schleiermacher. He later studied philology at the University of Munich, where his influences included Johann Andreas Schmeller. Holtzmann also attended classes in Paris given by Eugène Burnouf, and beginning in 1837, spent a number of years working as a tutor to members of Baden royalty. From 1852 he was a professor of German literature and Sanskrit at the University of Heidelberg, and a notable philologist of his day.

Holtzmann was the father-in-law of Albrecht Kossel, German biochemist and 1910 Nobel laureate, by his marriage to Holtzmann's daughter, Luise, in 1886.

Selected works 
 Ueber den griechischen Ursprung des indischen Thierkreises, 1841 – On the Greek origin of the Indian zodiac.
 Über den Umlaut. Zwei Abhandlungen, 1843 – On umlaut : two treatises.
 Über den Ablaut, 1844 – On ablaut.
 Beiträge zur Erklärung der persischen Keilinschriften, 1845 – Contributions to the explanation of Persian cuneiform inscriptions. 
 Indische Sagen, 1st part 1845 and 3rd part 1847 (2nd ed. in two volumes 1854) – Indian legends.
 Untersuchungen über das Nibelungenlied, 1854 – Investigations of the "Nibelungenlied".
 Kelten und Germanen. Eine historische Untersuchung, 1855 – Celts and Germans, a historical study.
 Der große Wolfdieterich, 1865 – Wolfdietrich.
 Altdeutsche Grammatik, umfassend die gotische, altnordische, altsächsische Sprache, 1870-75 (with Alfred Holder) – Old Germanic grammar; spanning Gothic, Old Norse and Old Saxon.
 Germanische Alterthümer. Mit Text, Übersetzung und Erklärung von Tacitus Germania, 1873 – Germanic antiquities with text, translation and explanation of Tacitus' "Germania". 
 Deutsche Mythologie, 1874 (edited by Alfred Holder; published posthumously) – German mythology.

See also
Holtzmann's Law

References

External links
 

1810 births
1870 deaths
German philologists
Linguists from Germany
Germanic studies scholars
Germanists
Writers from Karlsruhe
Linguists of Germanic languages
Academic staff of Heidelberg University
Ludwig Maximilian University of Munich alumni
Humboldt University of Berlin alumni
University of Halle alumni
German Sanskrit scholars